Dopestylevsky is the second studio album by Jewish rapper Eprhyme, released on April 26, 2011 by K Records. It is notable as the label's first hip-hop album in a decade, as K Records is typically known for punk and indie rock. A video for the album's lead single, "Life Sentence", was funded by Kickstarter and released on November 7, 2011.

Reception

Dopestylevsky received largely positive reviews. Jessica Monk of Tiny Mix Tapes called it "a solid album of consciousness-raising Jewish hip-hop, [although] not an exercise in genre-bending...we can believe the hype, and take it that this well-heeled genre has finally arrived chez K." John Book of Skyscraper magazine said, "Eprhyme is a nice breath of clarity that isn’t the exception to any specific rule, just hip-hop music at its best." Jay Michaelson of The Forward described it as "a more polished and more professional record" than his debut album, containing "less novelty, less preaching, but perhaps more potential to reach a wider audience with a Jewish flavor of hip-hop and rap."

In a negative review, Mike Schiller of PopMatters wrote, "Eprhyme demonstrates an impressive grasp of rhythm and rhyme, but his words are mere sounds that give us something to hold onto; they’re not meaningful, they’re not really about anything, they’re just there...Dopestylevsky is a perfectly pleasant hip-hop album that won’t get on anyone’s nerves [but not] the transcendental experience its author promises, nor does it even begin to live up to the literary figure referenced by its title."

Track listing

"Blow Up the Block" was previously released in single form by Shemspeed as "Boom Selecta", with an extra verse by Kosha Dillz.

Personnel

Smoke M2D6 – producer
Foundation – producer ("Poppasong")
AKA – featured artist
Brad B – featured artist
Skylar Blake – musician
Drew Cohen – vocals
Compost – featured artist
Darshan (Eprhyme and Shir Yaakov) – featured artist
DeScribe – featured artist
Glimpse – featured artist
Yosef Goldman – vocals
El Goonie – cut

Rolondo Guajardo – musician
Ardas Hassler – musician
Labtekwon – featured artist
Daniel Landin – musician
Tim Pollock – musician
Poweena – vocals
Tom Russell – musician
Jeff Rygwelski – musician
Saints of Everyday Failures (Eprhyme and D-Scribe) – featured artist
Xperience – featured artist
Y-Love – featured artist

References

External links
 

Eprhyme albums
2011 albums
K Records albums